The 2014–15 WNBL season was the 35th season of competition since its establishment in 1981. A total of 8 teams contested the league. The regular season was played between 17 October 2014 and 15 February 2015, followed by a post-season involving the top four on 21 February 2015 until 8 March 2015.

Broadcast rights were held by free-to-air network ABC. ABC broadcast one game a week, at 1:00PM at every standard time in Australia. Regular hosts are John Casey & Rachael Sporn.

Sponsorship included Wattle Valley, entering its second year as league naming rights sponsor. Spalding provided equipment including the official game ball, with Peak supplying team apparel.

Team standings

Finals

Statistics

Individual statistic leaders

Season award winners

Player of the Week Award

Player & Coach of the Month Awards

Postseason awards

References

 
2014–15 in Australian basketball
Australia
Basketball
Basketball